LINDO (Linear, Interactive, and Discrete Optimizer) is a software package for linear programming, integer programming, nonlinear programming, stochastic programming and global optimization.

Lindo also creates "What'sBest!" which is an add-in for linear, integer and nonlinear optimization. First released for Lotus 1-2-3 and later also for Microsoft Excel.

References

External links
 Official website 

Mathematical optimization software
Numerical software